The 2000 season was Club de Regatas Vasco da Gama's 102nd year in existence, the club's 85th season in existence of football, and the club's 30th season playing in the Brasileirão Série A, the top flight of Brazilian football.

Players

Squad information 

As of 18 January 2001.

Pre-season and friendlies

Competitions 
Times from 1 January to 26 February 2000 and from 8 October to 31 December 2000 are UTC–2, from 27 February 2000 to 7 October 2000 UTC–3.

Brasileirão

League stage

League table

Results summary

Result round by round

Matches

Championship knockout phase

Copa do Brasil

Club World Championship

Club World Championship squad

Group stage

Final

Campeonato do Estado do Rio de Janeiro

Taça Guanabara

Taça Rio de Janeiro

Championship phase

Copa Mercosur

Group stage 
Group E

Knockout phase

Torneio Rio de Janeiro – São Paulo

Group stage 
Group B

Knockout phase

Statistics

Squad appearances and goals 
Last updated on 18 January 2001.

|-
! colspan=18 style=background:#dcdcdc; text-align:center|Goalkeepers

|-
! colspan=18 style=background:#dcdcdc; text-align:center|Defenders

|-
! colspan=18 style=background:#dcdcdc; text-align:center|Midfielders

|-
! colspan=18 style=background:#dcdcdc; text-align:center|Forwards

|}

Notes

See also 
 2000 Club World Championship
 2000 Torneio Rio de Janeiro – São Paulo
 2000 Campeonato do Estado do Rio de Janeiro
 2000 Copa do Brasil
 2000 Brasileirão
 2000 Copa Mercosur

References 

CR Vasco da Gama
Club de Regatas Vasco da Gama seasons
Vasco da Gama